The  is a professional wrestling championship owned and promoted by the New Japan Pro-Wrestling (NJPW) promotion. The current champion is Kenny Omega, who is in his second reign.

History

Background
On May 12, 2017, during the third night of the War of the Worlds tour, co-produced by New Japan Pro-Wrestling (NJPW) and Ring of Honor (ROH), NJPW United States Ambassador George Carroll announced the creation of the IWGP United States Championship. The following day, NJPW revealed the title's official name as the IWGP United States  Championship. The title is part of an American expansion plan which NJPW had made public in the months before the announcement. Plans had been made to run extended tours in the United States with California as the base, starting in 2018. The plan was a direct response to WWE taking four wrestlers from NJPW in January 2016. Tetsuya Naito noted how the new title had the same concept as the IWGP Intercontinental Championship, which had been established during NJPW's May 2011 United States tour, promoted in conjunction with Jersey All Pro Wrestling (JAPW). NJPW chairman Naoki Sugabayashi stated that he wanted the title to be defended at future NJPW events in the United States as well as events held by ROH. The title belt was made red to distinguish it from the black IWGP Heavyweight Championship belt and the white IWGP Intercontinental Championship belt. The title has often been defended in non-disqualification/hardcore matches, including at Wrestle Kingdom 12, on night one of Wrestle Kingdom 14, and on night two of Wrestle Kingdom 16.

Inaugural tournament

The first champion would be crowned in a single-elimination tournament on the weekend of July 1 and 2, 2017, during NJPW's G1 Special in USA shows in Long Beach, California.  Jay Lethal was the first participant announced for the tournament on May 12. On May 18, Hangman Page was officially added to the tournament. The other six participants as well as the bracket of the tournament, confirmed as a single-elimination tournament, were revealed on June 12. Kenny Omega went on to defeat Tomohiro Ishii in the final to become the inaugural champion.

Establishment
Since its creation, the IWGP United States Heavyweight Championship has been defended in both Japan and the United States with the first Japanese defense taking place on September 24, 2017, at Destruction in Kobe and the first stateside defense taking place on October 15, 2017, at Global Wars: Chicago. After it had been announced in November 2017 that former WWE wrestler Chris Jericho would be challenging for the title at Wrestle Kingdom 12 in Tokyo Dome, Omega stated that the title had already surpassed the IWGP Intercontinental Championship as the number two championship in NJPW. However, the promotion ranks the title in the second tier, behind both the IWGP Heavyweight and Intercontinental Championships and alongside the NEVER Openweight Championship.

Throughout 2020, the COVID-19 pandemic prevented the champion Jon Moxley from traveling to Japan for NJPW events while keeping his commitments with All Elite Wrestling (AEW), with whom he is also contracted. His AEW contract also prevented him from appearing at NJPW's American events. This resulted in the championship not being defended from February 2020 to February 2021, when an arrangement was made between the two promotions to allow Moxley to appear on NJPW's American television show Strong in a title defense.

With AEW and New Japan forming a working relationship, Jon Moxley was permitted to defend the title on AEW's flagship television program, AEW Dynamite. In May 2021, the title was defended in AEW for the first time, with Moxley defeating Yuji Nagata in his fourth title defense. In July 2021 at AEW Fyter Fest Night 1, Moxley retained the championship for his record-setting fifth defense against Impact Wrestling's Karl Anderson. The following week on Night 2 of the event, Lance Archer defeated Moxley for the championship in a Texas Death Match for his second reign.

Reigns

Kenny Omega was the inaugural champion. Hiroshi Tanahashi and Juice Robinson are tied for the record of most reigns with three, while Tanahashi was the first Japanese wrestler to win the title. Jon Moxley holds two records with the title: his second reign is the longest reign at 564 days with five successful defenses, and he is the only wrestler to have held the title for a consecutive year. Tanahashi’s third reign of 13 days is the shortest in the title's history. Tanahashi was the oldest champion when he won it at 45 years old, while Jay White was the youngest champion at 25 years old.

Kenny Omega is the current champion in his second reign. He defeated Will Ospreay on January 4, 2022 at Wrestle Kingdom 17 in Tokyo, Japan.

Combined reigns

References

External links
Official title history at NJPW.co.jp

Heavyweight wrestling championships
New Japan Pro-Wrestling championships
United States professional wrestling championships